André van der Zander (born 24 October 1975 in Germany) is a German retired footballer.

Career

Van der Zander started his career for Fortuna Sittard in the Dutch top flight, making 9 league appearances there.

In 1998, he signed for German Bundesliga side Bayer 04 Leverkusen, but failed to break into their first team despite consistently playing well for their reserves.

During 2002, van der Zander stayed with SC Fortuna Köln in the German fourth division even though he received offers from second division clubs Eintracht Braunschweig and Karlsruher SC due to family reasons.

For the second half of 2002/03, he returned to Germania Teveren in the lower leagues because of SC Fortuna Köln's financial problems.

References

External links
 

German footballers
Living people
Association football midfielders
1975 births
Fortuna Sittard players
Germania Teveren players
SC Fortuna Köln players